Michael Friend (born October 4, 1961) is a politician from the U.S. state of Nebraska. He represented an Omaha district in the Nebraska Legislature, and later became and the first Director of Nebraska's Office of Violence Prevention.

Friend was born in Omaha, and graduated from Millard Senior High School in 1980. He then attended Kearney State College from 1980 to 1982 and Creighton University in journalism, graduated in 1985 but studied law for an extra year. In 2002, Friend was elected to represent the 10th Legislative District in the Nebraska Legislature.  He was re-elected in 2006 with over 76% of the vote. He sat on the General Affairs, Revenue, and Legislative Performance Audit Committees, and chaired the Urban Affairs Committee.

In 2006, Nebraska lawmakers passed a bill sponsored by Friend that restricts picketing and protesting at funerals. The law was designed to prohibit picketing a funeral within 300 feet of a cemetery, mortuary or church between one hour before and two hours following an event. The impetus for the legislation was a group of protesters who made a habit of picketing military funerals, as a form of protest against the United States.

In August 2009, Friend resigned from the Legislature after governor Dave Heineman appointed him Director of the Office of Violence Prevention. The office holds the responsibility of overseeing grants to combat community violence. Friend left the Office of Violence Prevention in 2011.

References

Sources

External links
Nebraska Office of Violence Prevention, ncc.ne.gov; accessed May 24, 2017.

1961 births
Living people
Republican Party Nebraska state senators
Politicians from Omaha, Nebraska
Creighton University alumni